Tim Murray (born July 30, 1987) is an American soccer player.

Honours

Individual
Veikkausliiga Goalkeeper of the Year: 2020
Veikkausliiga Team of the Year: 2020

Career

College
Murray attended St. John's Preparatory School in Danvers, Massachusetts, and played four years of college soccer at Providence College. He holds the Providence College record for most career shutouts, and helped the Friars reach the NCAA Tournament in 2006 and 2007. He played in 60 career college games, and compiled 201 saves.

Murray also spent two seasons with the New Hampshire Phantoms of the USL Premier Development League.

Professional
Murray signed his first professional contract on April 29, 2010 when he signed with Major League Soccer team New England Revolution. Because of injuries to other keepers, he finished his rookie season second on the Revs' goalkeeper depth chart after starting preseason as the fourth goalkeeper in camp, but did not make a senior MLS appearance.

Murray was loaned to F.C. New York of the USL Professional Division in 2011 after FCNY's first choice goalkeeper Derby Carillo suffered an injury. He made his professional debut on April 30, 2011 in a 2-1 loss to Orlando City.

Murray was released by New England on December 2, 2012. He entered the 2012 MLS Re-Entry Draft and became a free agent after going undrafted in both rounds of the draft.

In March 2015, Murray signed a one-year contract with Ekenäs Sport Club, a newly promoted club in Kakkonen in the third tier of the Finnish football league system.

On February 2, 2022, Murray signed with Chattanooga Red Wolves in USL League One.

References

External links

 
 Providence bio
 

1987 births
Living people
American soccer players
Association football goalkeepers
Ekenäs IF players
F.C. New York players
FC Honka players
New England Revolution players
North American Soccer League players
North Carolina FC players
Providence Friars men's soccer players
Seacoast United Phantoms players
Chattanooga Red Wolves SC players
USL Championship players
USL League Two players
Kakkonen players
Ykkönen players
Veikkausliiga players
Soccer players from Massachusetts
Sportspeople from Haverhill, Massachusetts
American expatriate soccer players
Expatriate footballers in Finland
American expatriate sportspeople in Finland